Metropolitan Miami may refer to:
South Florida metropolitan area, also known as the Miami metropolitan area
Metropolitan Miami (development), a mixed-use development in Downtown Miami

See also
Miami Metro (disambiguation)

fr:Metropolitan Miami